Caloptilia ostryaeella is a moth of the family Gracillariidae. It is known from Québec, Canada, and Kentucky, Maine, Ohio and Vermont in the United States.

The larvae feed on Carpinus and Ostrya species, including Ostrya virginiana and Ostrya virginica. They mine the leaves of their host plant. The mine has the form of a linear, whitish mine on the upper side of the leaf. The leaf cone is at the apex of the leaf.

References

External links
Caloptilia at microleps.org
mothphotographersgroup

ostryaeella
Moths of North America
Moths described in 1878